Ian Edward Stenlake (born 5 July 1969 in Barcaldine, Queensland, Australia) is an Australian actor.<

Career
Stenlake's career began during a trip to Rome when he was convinced to become an extra in a movie that was being filmed there - as a waiter in the Godfather III.
Stenlake is perhaps best known for the role of Constable Oscar Stone which he played in the Australian police drama series Stingers  from 1998 to 2002. In 1997, he played Anthony Gibson in Emmerdale: The Dingles Down Under.

Stenlake has starred in numerous other visual media, and also, theatre productions.

Stenlake played Mike Flynn, the commanding officer of the patrol boat HMAS Hammersley, in Sea Patrol which first aired on the Nine Network in 2007. Stenlake was involved in all five seasons of the series.

Stage
Stenlake has starred in many stage productions, including 
 MammaMia! (2018, as Sam)
 Cabaret (2003, as Cliff)
 Eureka (2004, as Peter Lalor),
 They're Playing Our Song (2003 as Vernon Gersch)
 Oklahoma! (2005, as Curly),
 The Pajama Game (2006, as Syd ),
 Sleeping Beauty (2007)
 Guys & Dolls (2008, as Sky Masterson), at the Princess Theatre in Melbourne and at the Capitol Theatre in Sydney.
 Next To Normal (Dan - cancelled)
 Bille Brown - Father Michael Walsh (2009)
 Around the World in 80 Days - Phileas Fogg (2016)

Television
Project one Shot (short)  (2014)
Revolving Doors (short)  (2013)
Dance Academy - Gav (2012)
Sea Patrol - Lieutenant Commander / Commander Mike Flynn (2007-2011)
All the Little Pieces (short) - Charlie (2011)
Natural Selection (TV short) - Jason/John (2006)
Stingers - Constable Oscar Stone (1998-2002)
Murder Call - Jamie Nikolides (1997)
Children's Hospital - James (1997)
Emmerdale: The Dingles Down Under - Anthony Gibson (1997)
Trapped in Space (TV movie) - Tug medic (1995)

Concert
 Stenlake has also performed in numerous cabaret shows around the country and appeared in Vision Australia's Carols by Candlelight for Channel 9 in 2006 to 2008.
 For the Adelaide Cabaret Festival in June 2011,Stenlake performed More Than Words with wife, Rachael Beck
 Performed with Rachael Beck in You and I for 12 Acts of Cabaret in Brisbane, 2 June 2011
 Ian is a member of 'The Leading Men' composed of four award-winning stars of musical theatre, these extraordinary talents have all played leading roles in the world’s most loved musicals on the Australian stage, the international stage or both.

Personal life
Stenlake married Amber Mulley on 4 September 2017.

Stenlake was married to Australian musical theatre star Rachael Beck until 2012. Their daughter Tahlula was born on 15 January 2007. Their second child, Roxie, was born on 19 April 2009.

Awards and nominations

References

External links

Ian Stenlake Official Website

Male actors from Queensland
1969 births
Living people
Australian male musical theatre actors